Pseudognathobotys africalis is a moth in the family Crambidae. It was described by Koen V. N. Maes in 2001. It is found in the Democratic Republic of the Congo (North Kivu) and Uganda.

References

Spilomelinae
Moths described in 2001